Flavobacterium chungnamense is a Gram-negative, aerobic, rod-shaped and non-motile bacterium from the genus of Flavobacterium.

References

chungnamense
Bacteria described in 2012